Sobradelo da Goma is a Portuguese Freguesia in the municipality of Póvoa de Lanhoso, it has an area of 10.23 km² and 794 inhabitants (2011). Its population density is 77.6 people per km².

Population

References 

Freguesias of Póvoa de Lanhoso